Matachewan is a township in Timiskaming, Northeastern Ontario, Canada, located at the end of Ontario Highway 66 along the Montreal River.  The name is derived from the Cree word for "meeting of the currents".

The town's main economy is based on mineral mining, mainly gold mining, with some tourism.

History
It consisted only of a large depot and stores, with a church added later on. The local First Nations, who traded their furs here, would camp along the Montreal River but not settle permanently.

Jake Davidson discovered gold in 1916 and teamed up with Weldy Young in 1930 to start the Young-Davidson mine.  Sam Otisse staked a claim next to Davidson in 1917, which became the Matachewan Consolidated Mines.  Alex Mosher staked claims which became the Ashley Gold Mine (1932-1936).

The impetus to the town's growth came in the 1920s when mineral deposits, such as gold, copper, and molybdenite, were found in the area. From then on it experienced boom and bust cycles of typical mining towns, depending on the swings in commodity prices, but its economy has gradually shifted to forestry and tourism.

In January 1976, the Improvement District of Matachewan was formed, and in 1995, it was incorporated as a township.

The Otisse Lake overflowed into mine tailings on 17 Oct. 1990, and 170,000 cubic metres of mine slimes entered the Matachewan River.

In 2006, a medivac helipad was built to help accommodate the possibility of injuries that may occur at the Young-Davidson mine site. In 2008, an old and worn out wooden bridge over the Montreal River which was built in 1937 was replaced with a new steel-concrete reinforced structure for safety reasons regarding the heavy traffic to/from the mine.

Geology
Matachewan is on the southwest portion of the Abitibi greenstone belt and within the Abitibi gold belt.  Between 1933 and 1957, the Young-Davidson Mine and the Matachewan Consolidated Mine produced 9.6 million tonnes of ore containing 3.1 grams of gold per ton and 0.93 grams per ton of silver.  Between 1979 and 1980, Pamour Porcupine Mines Limited open-pit mining produced 18,000 tonnes of ore containing more than 3.4 grams per ton of gold.

Demographics 

Culture
Matachewan is known for celebrating local cultures every July during the Matachewan Villages Festival event.

Transportation 
Provincial highways:
Highway 65
Highway 66

See also
List of townships in Ontario
List of francophone communities in Ontario
Kirkland Lake
Porcupine Gold Rush
Cobalt silver rush
Red Lake, Ontario
Greenstone, Ontario
Hemlo, Ontario

References

External links 

Municipalities in Timiskaming District
Single-tier municipalities in Ontario
Township municipalities in Ontario